The Trumpet Concerto, K. 47c, is a putative concerto for trumpet by Wolfgang Amadeus Mozart, that is now lost (if it ever existed). It would be Mozart's only concerto written for a brass instrument other than his four horn concertos.

History and evidence for existence
The only evidence for the existence of the concerto is a letter written on 12 November 1768 by Mozart's father, Leopold, in Vienna to Lorenz Hagenauer back in Salzburg, the Mozarts' home. In the letter, Leopold wrote that "the new church of Father Parhammer's orphanage will be consecrated on the Feast of the Immaculate Conception. For this feast, Wolfgang has composed a solemn mass, an offertorium and a trumpet concerto for a boy...". The church involved was the church  on the Rennweg in the Vienna district of Landstraße, and the intended soloist may have been an orphan, Ignatz Schmatz. The consecration is known to have happened, as the Wienerisches Diarium reported on the service on 10 December 1768. However, as the trumpet concerto does not appear on Leopold's list of his son's works, it is uncertain whether it ever actually existed. The other compositions performed at the service are thought to be the Missa solemnis in C minor, K. 139 ("Waisenhaus"), and a lost offertory (previously thought to be the extant Benedictus sit deus, K. 117).

Loss
If the concerto was indeed written, no copy is known to survive. The surviving manuscripts from the Kirche Mariä Geburt, now in the Wiener Priesterseminar, show no trace of the work.

References

Concertos by Wolfgang Amadeus Mozart
Lost musical works
Mozart, Wolfgang